Massiges is a commune in the Marne department in north-eastern France.

The neighbouring Main de Massiges, an elevated geographical feature shaped like a left hand, was the site of considerable fighting during the First World War.

See also
Communes of the Marne department

References

Communes of Marne (department)